Douglas R. Powell (1920–2006) was a geographer at the University of California, Berkeley. 

Powell was known for being one of the first snow surveyors in the world. He worked with the California Cooperate Snow Survey for 28 years and established snow surveying programs in Afghanistan and Chile. 

 In 1976 the university awarded him the Distinguished Teaching Award.
 He was voted "Best Undergraduate Instructor" by the student body.
 The Western Montana Atlas of Panoramic Aerial Images is dedicated to his memory.
 A memorial fund in his name, the Douglas R. Powell Fund for Field Geography, was established at UC Berkeley.

References

1920 births
2006 deaths
American geographers
20th-century geographers
University of California, Berkeley alumni
American expatriates in Chile
American expatriates in Afghanistan